Lightspark is a free and open-source SWF player released under the terms of the GNU Lesser General Public License (LGPL) version 3.

Features 
Lightspark supports most of ActionScript 3.0 and has an NPAPI plug-in. It will fall back on Gnash, a free SWF player on ActionScript 1.0 and 2.0 (AVM1) code.

Lightspark supports OpenGL-based rendering and LLVM-based ActionScript execution and uses OpenGL shaders (GLSL). The player is compatible with H.264 Flash videos on YouTube.

Portability 
The Lightspark player is completely portable. It has been successfully built on Ubuntu 11.04 (Natty Narwhal) on PowerPC, x86, ARM and AMD64 architectures. Lightspark has a Win32 branch for Microsoft Visual Studio and introduced a Mozilla-compatible plug-in for Windows in version 0.5.3. Since then, the project hasn't seen any official Windows release, but newer versions are continuously built and made available through Jenkins.

See also

 Mozilla Shumway

References

Further reading

External links
 
 Developer's blog
 Lightspark at GitHub
 Lightspark at Launchpad
 

Adobe Flash
Free software programmed in C++
2013 software